Ásta Árnadóttir (born 9 June 1983) is an Icelandic footballer who plays the position of defender. Ásta was part of Iceland's national team and was a member of the squad at UEFA Women's Euro 2009. Ásta has played for Tyresö FF in Sweden. She returned to Iceland to Valur in December 2009 but was undecided on whether she'd play any more football. She played one game during the 2010 season, which ended up being the national championship clinching game.

She returned to the field in 2016 when she played for Knattspyrnufélagið Hlíðarendi in the 1. deild kvenna. In 2018 she joined Augnablik and helped the team win the 2. deild kvenna and achieve promotion to the 1. deild kvenna.

She was known for her flick-flack throw-ins and recorded a video for UEFA Training Ground series, demonstrating the technique.

International career
Ásta made her senior international debut for Iceland in a 4–3 defeat by the United States in September 2004.

At UEFA Women's Euro 2009, Ásta was included in the squad but did not play in any of the matches as Iceland were eliminated in the first round.

Titles
Icelandic Championships: 5
2004, 2006, 2007, 2008, 2010
Icelandic Cup: 1
2006
Icelandic Super Cup: 3
2005, 2007, 2008
2. deild kvenna: 1
2018

References

External links

1983 births
Living people
Asta Arnadottir
Asta Arnadottir
Tyresö FF players
Damallsvenskan players
Expatriate women's footballers in Sweden
Asta Arnadottir
Women's association football defenders
Valur (women's football) players